The Supercopa Uruguaya (Uruguayan Supercup) is an annual one-match football official competition in Uruguay organised by the Uruguayan Football Association (AUF) which is played between the Primera División champions and the Torneo Intermedio winners of the previous season, starting from 2018. This competition serves as the season curtain-raiser and is scheduled to be played in late January or early February each year, one week before the start of the season.

Participating clubs
The Supercopa Uruguaya is played between:
 The Primera División champions (Campeón Uruguayo)
 The Torneo Intermedio winners

In the event the same club wins both the league and the Torneo Intermedio, its rival in the Supercopa will be the Torneo Intermedio runner-up.

Competition format 
 One 90-minute game at a neutral venue
 If tied, 30 minutes of extra time are played
 If still tied at the end of extra time, penalties decide the winner

Finals

Performance by club

References

External links
 AUF website

 
Football competitions in Uruguay
Uruguay